Chinese sweet tea, also known as Tian-cha, is a traditional Chinese herbal tea, made from the leaves of Chinese blackberry (Rubus suavissimus). These leaves contain a natural sweetener, called rubusoside, which is 200 times as sweet as cane sugar. The tea has long been used to alleviate kidney symptoms, and a recent Japanese study also indicates that it has anti-inflammatory effects and helps against allergies.

See also
Chinese herb tea

References

Herbal tea